This is a list of current urban debate leagues in the United States.

National organizations
National organizations include:

Associated Leaders of Urban Debate
National Association for Urban Debate Leagues
National Debate Project

Urban debate leagues

National Association for Urban Debate Leagues 

Atlanta
Austin, Texas
Baltimore
Boston
Chicago
Dallas
Denver
Detroit
Houston
Kansas City, Kansas
Los Angeles
Miami
Memphis, Tennessee
Milwaukee
Minneapolis
Nashville, Tennessee
New York City
Portland, Oregon
Rhode Island
San Francisco Bay Area
Silicon Valley
Tulsa, Oklahoma
Washington, D.C.

Other 
IMPACT Coalition (New York City)

References 

Policy debate